Yad may refer to:

Hebrew usage
Yad (יד) means hand in Hebrew.  

It can refer to a  
Yad, a pointer used for Torah reading in Jewish synagogues
Yad Hachazakah, an alternate name for the Mishneh Torah, the code of Maimonides

Yad can also refer to a monument or memorial.  In this usage, it forms a part of several place names:
Yad Vashem, the Holocaust memorial museum in Jerusalem
Yad Mordechai, a kibbutz near Ashkelon
Yad Avshalom, an ancient tomb in Jerusalem
Yad Kennedy, a memorial for John F. Kennedy in Jerusalem
Yad La-Shiryon, a memorial for the Israeli armed forces near Latrun
Yad Natan, a moshav near Kiryat Gat
Yad Sarah, an Israeli volunteer organization

Other uses
Yad, Iran, a village in Isfahan Province
 Moose Lake Airport, Canada (by IATA code)
 Yagua language (by ISO 639 code)